Enthusiast Gaming is a Canadian digital media company specializing in video game journalism. Founded in 2014 by entrepreneur Menashe Kestenbaum, the company owned the websites Destructoid and Escapist Magazine from 2014 to September 2022, as well the gaming convention Enthusiast Gaming Live Expo (EGLX).

The company went public on the TSX Venture Exchange in October 2018. In January 2020 the company's listing moved to the Toronto Stock Exchange. In April 2021, the company also began trading on the Nasdaq.

Brands 
Enthusiast Gaming owns a number of websites and runs an annual convention in Toronto.

Websites 
 Daily Esports (founded 2018)
 DiabloII Net & Wiki (acquired 2018)
 Gaming Street (founded 2019)
 Nintendo Enthusiast (founded 2011, by Enthusiast Gaming founder)
 Gamnesia (acquired 2018)
 Planet Destiny (acquired 2019)
 PlayStation Enthusiast (founded 2015)
 Steel Media (Pocket Gamer) (acquired 2019)
 The Sims Resource (acquired 2019)
 Xbox Enthusiast (founded 2015)
 Omnia Media (acquired 2020)
 Icy Veins (acquired 2021)
 Tabstats (acquired 2021)
 GameKnot (acquired 2021)
 Addicting Games (acquired 2021)
 UGG (acquired 2021)

Former 
Gamurs Group acquired six websites from Enthusiast Gaming in September 2022:

 Destructoid (acquired 2017)
 Flixist (acquired 2017)
 Japanator (acquired 2017, merged into Siliconera)
 The Escapist (acquired 2018)
 Gameumentary (acquired 2018)
 Only Single Player (acquired 2016)
 Operation Sports (acquired 2018)
 PC Invasion (acquired 2018)
 Siliconera (acquired 2019)
 Upcomer (founded 2021)

Esports teams 
 Vancouver Titans (Overwatch – Overwatch League)
 Seattle Surge (Call of Duty)
 Luminosity Gaming (multiple titles)

EGLX 
Enthusiast Gaming Live Expo (EGLX) is an annual gaming convention hosted at the Metro Toronto Convention Centre. It is billed as Canada's largest video game convention, with a reported peak of 30,000 attendees. In October 2018, Enthusiast Gaming announced that EGLX will host the World Electronic Sports Games Canadian Championship.

References

External links 

 
 

Mass media companies established in 2014
Video game journalism
Companies based in Toronto
Companies listed on the Toronto Stock Exchange
Companies formerly listed on the TSX Venture Exchange